The Hennessy Ladies Cup was a women's professional golf tournament on the Ladies European Tour that took place in France and Germany.

Winners

Source:

References

External links
Ladies European Tour

Former Ladies European Tour events
Defunct golf tournaments in France
Golf tournaments in Germany